Luisa (Italian and Spanish), Luísa (Portuguese) or Louise (French) is a feminine given name; it is the feminine form of the given name Louis (Luis), the French form of the  Frankish  Chlodowig (German Ludwig), from the Germanic elements hlod "fame" and wig "combat".

Variations include Luisinha, Luisella, Luisana, Luisetta, Luigia, Luisel. 
Its popularity derives from the cult of Saint Louise de Marillac of Paris, and from Giuseppe Verdi's  opera Luisa Miller.

People with the given name

Luisa
Luisa Accati (born 1942), Italian historian, anthropologist and feminist public intellectual
Luisa Cáceres de Arismendi (1799–1866), heroine of the Venezuelan War of Independence
Luisa Baldini, Anglo-Italian news reporter and presenter, presently working for BBC News
Luisa Bradshaw-White (born 1975), English actress
Luisa María Calderón (born 1965), Mexican politician
Luisa Capetillo (1879–1922), Corsican-Puerto Rican writer and anarchist
Luisa Casati (1881–1957), Italian artists' model
Luisa Castro (born 1966), Spanish poet and writer
Luísa Diogo (born 1958), Mozambican politician, Prime Minister of Mozambique from February 2004 to December 2010
Luisa DiPietro, faculty member at the University of Illinois at Chicago College of Dentistry
Luisa Durán (born 1941), former First Lady of Chile, the wife of Chile Ricardo Lagos
Luisa "Loi" Ejercito Estrada (born 1930), Filipino politician
Luisa Ferida (1914–1945), Italian stage and motion picture actress
Luisa Görlich (born 1998), German ski jumper
Luisa Martín (born 1960), Spanish actress
Luisa of Medina-Sidonia (1613–1666), Queen of Portugal
Luisa Menárguez, Spanish harpist and educator
Luisa Micheletti (born 1983), presenter on MTV Brazil
Luisa Moreno (1907–1992), Guatemalan-American communist and writer
Luisa Morgantini (born 1940), Italian politician, Member of the European Parliament
Luisa Eugenia Navas, Chilean pharmacist and botanist
Luisa Ottolini (born 1954), Italian physicist
Luisa Ranieri (born 1973), Italian actress
Luisa Rivelli (born 1930), Italian film actress
Luisa Roldán (1652–1706), Spanish sculptor of the Baroque Era
Luisa Rossi (1925–1984), Italian actress
Luisa Sala (1923–1986), Spanish actress
Luisa Tetrazzini (1871–1940), Italian coloratura soprano
Luisa Torsi (born 1964), Italian chemist
Luisa Värk (born 1987), Estonian singer
Luisa Wilson (born 2005), Mexican-Canadian ice hockey player
Luisa Zissman (born 1987), British television personality
Luisa Stefani (born 1997) Brazilian professional tennis player

Luisel
Luisel Ramos (1984-2006), Uruguayan model

Luisana

Luisana Lopilato (born 1987), Argentine actress and model

Fictional characters with the name
Luisa Alver, a fictional character played by Yara Martinez in the series Jane the Virgin
Luisa Anselmi, a fictional character played by Anouk Aimée in the 1962 film 8½
Luisa Contini, a fictional character played by Marion Cotillard in the 2009 film Nine
Luisa "Adelita" Espina, a fictional character played by Carla Baratta in the series Mayans MC
Luisa Madrigal, a fictional character played by Jessica Darrow in the Disney film Encanto

Other uses
 Luisa Miller is an opera by Giuseppe Verdi
 Luisa was Giovanni da Verrazzano's name for Block Island
 Luisa Piccarreta also known as "Little Daughter of the Divine Will" is a proposed Roman Catholic saint
 "Luísa" is a song composed by Tom Jobim Antônio Carlos Jobim

Italian feminine given names 
Portuguese feminine given names
Spanish feminine given names